Marrs Center is an unincorporated community in Marrs Township, Posey County, in the U.S. state of Indiana.

History
Marrs Center took its name from Marrs Township.

Geography

References

Unincorporated communities in Posey County, Indiana
Unincorporated communities in Indiana